Robert Francis Moss  (13 July 1914 — 16 January 1977) was an English first-class cricketer and British Army officer.

The son of William Henry Moss and his wife, Rose Winifred Moss, he was born at Godden Green in Kent. He was educated at Malvern College, before proceeding to British India where he gained a commission in the British Indian Army.

References

External links

1914 births
1977 deaths
People from Sevenoaks District
People educated at Malvern College
English cricketers
Mumbai cricketers
Europeans cricketers
Royal Gurkha Rifles officers
British Army personnel of World War II
Members of the Order of the British Empire